Alberto Iñurrategi Iriarte (November 3, 1968) is a Basque Spanish mountaineer born in Aretxabaleta, Gipuzkoa, Basque Country (Spain), 3 November 1968. In the year 2002, he became the second Spaniard and Basque (after Juanito Oiarzabal) and the 10th person to climb the 14 eight-thousanders.

He was 33 years old when he completed the eight-thousanders making him the youngest person to climb all 14. 12 of the peaks were climbed with his brother Felix who died on the descent of Gasherbrum II. Iñurrategi climbed the peaks in an Alpine style using few lines or sherpas and no bottled oxygen making him the fourth person to have climbed all 14 peaks without bottled oxygen. In collaboration with other climbers, he has produced several climbing documentaries such as Annapurna: sueño y vacío, Gure Himalaya and Hire Himalaya.

Climbing the 14 eight-thousanders 

 30.09.1991: Makalu (8485 m)
 25.09.1992: Mount Everest (8848 m)
 24.06.1994: K2 (8611 m)
 11.09.1995: Cho Oyu (8188 m)
 27.09.1995: Lhotse (8516 m)
 06.05.1996: Kangchenjunga (8586 m)
 11.10.1996: Shishapangma (8027 m)
 13.07.1997: Broad Peak (8051 m)
 23.05.1998: Dhaulagiri (8167 m)
 29.07.1999: Nanga Parbat (8125 m)
 25.04.2000: Manaslu (8163 m)
 28.07.2000: Gasherbrum II (8034 m)
 08.07.2001: Hidden Peak (8080 m) 
 16.05.2002: Annapurna (8091 m)

See also
List of climbers, alpinists and mountaineers
List of 20th century summiters of Mount Everest

References
Climbers who have reached the summit of all 14 eight-thousanders. 8000ers.com

Summiters of all 14 eight-thousanders
Spanish mountain climbers
People from Debagoiena
1968 births
Living people